One Cold Winter's Night is a live album released in 2006 by the symphonic power metal band Kamelot on the SPV label Steamhammer in Germany. It is the second live album and first live DVD from the band, and was released on November 14, 2006. It marks the first appearance of Oliver Palotai on keyboards. The album featured guest appearances by Simone Simons while the second disc of the DVD set contained a number of interviews and videos.

The CD release contained the audio from the live in Oslo, Norway on 11 February 2006.

DVD track listing

Disc One - The Concert 
 "Intro: Un assassinio molto silenzioso"
 "The Black Halo"
 "Soul Society"
 "The Edge of Paradise"
 "Center of the Universe"
 "Nights of Arabia ”
 "Abandoned"
 "Forever"
 "Keyboard Solo"
 "The Haunting (Somewhere in Time)"
 "Moonlight"
 "When the Lights Are Down"
 "Elizabeth (Parts I, II & III)"
 "March of Mephisto"
 "Karma"
 "Drum Solo"
 "Farewell"
 "Curtain Call/Outro"

Disc 2 - Extras 
Journey Within:
 HaloVision with Khan
 Up Close with Thomas Youngblood at home
 Casey Grillo at the drums
 Up Close Interview with Casey Grillo at home
 Up Close with Oliver Palotai
 Interview with Simone Simons from the band Epica

Videos:
 "The Haunting"
 "March of Mephisto"
 "March of Mephisto" (uncensored)
 "Serenade"
 Making of "The Haunting"
 "March of Mephisto" – Live at Sweden Rock 2006

Miscellaneous:
 Photo Gallery including two slideshows of concert photos and band's private photos
 Band Member Biographies and Top Fives
 Discography

CD track listing

Disc one 
 "Intro: Un assassinio molto silenzioso" – 0:56
 "The Black Halo" – 3:39
 "Soul Society" – 4:35
 "The Edge of Paradise" – 4:44
 "Center of the Universe" – 6:02
 "Nights of Arabia" – 6:26
 "Abandoned" – 4:10
 "Forever" – 7:55
 "Keyboard Solo" – 1:45
 "The Haunting (Somewhere in Time)" – 4:33
 "Moonlight" – 5:10

Disc two 
 "When the Lights Are Down" – 4:29
 "Elizabeth (Parts I, II & III)" – 13:01
 "March of Mephisto" – 5:06
 "Karma" – 5:41
 "Drum Solo" – 2:50
 "Farewell" – 5:22
 "Outro" – 4:10
 "Epilogue" – 2:40 (Japanese bonus track)

Charts

Line-up

Kamelot
 Roy Khan – vocals
 Thomas Youngblood – guitars, backing vocals
 Glenn Barry – bass guitar
 Casey Grillo – drums
 Oliver Palotai – keyboards

Guest musicians
 Simone Simons – Marguerite on "The Haunting"
 Mari Youngblood – Helena on "Center of the Universe", "Abandoned" and Elizabeth Bathory on "Elizabeth pt I, II & III"
 Elisabeth Kjærnes – "Nights of Arabia" and "March of Mephisto"
 Snowy Shaw – acting Mephisto on "March of Mephisto"
 Halo choir: Karianne Kjærnes, Marianne Follestad, and Christian Kjærnes
 Voice of Mephisto on "March of Mephisto" by Shagrath
 Additional vocals on "Elizabeth" by Liv Nina Mosveen
 Vocals on "Un Assassinio Molto Silenzioso" by Cinzia Rizzo

References

External links 
 Kamelot homepage

Kamelot albums
2006 live albums
2006 video albums
Live video albums
SPV/Steamhammer live albums
SPV/Steamhammer video albums